Janelle James is an American comedian, actress, and writer. She is best known for her role as Ava Coleman in the television series Abbott Elementary, for which she won a Black Reel Award, a Screen Actors Guild Award, and an NAACP Image Award, in addition to nominations for a Primetime Emmy Award, a Golden Globe Award, a Critics' Choice Award, and an Independent Spirit Award.

Her writing credits include Black Monday, and she acted on the programs Crashing, Corporate, and Central Park. Her debut comedy album Black and Mild was released in 2017. She was named one of Varietys 10 Comics to Watch for 2020.

Career

Stand-up and television 
James began her career in 2009 at an open mic she attended while living in Champaign, Illinois. She described her style of comedy as "just talking shit" and her stand-up includes a range of topics such as Trump, motherhood, being a woman over 35, and dating. James named Bill Burr, Hadiyah Robinson, John Early, Wanda Sykes, Richard Pryor, and Kareem Green as favorite comedians.

In 2016, James' work was recognized by Just for Laughs and Brooklyn. She gained wider prominence as the opening act for Chris Rock's 2017 Total Blackout tour. That year, she released her debut comedy album Black and Mild. The show was recorded at Acme Comedy Company in Minneapolis.

She performed on Netflix's 2018 comedy series The Comedy Lineup. She was also slated to perform at the network's inaugural Netflix Is a Joke comedy festival based in Los Angeles in 2020.

James was a staff writer for The Rundown with Robin Thede (2017) and the Showtime comedy Black Monday, and also acted in a recurring role on the show. She has also appeared on the shows Crashing, Corporate, and is both a writer and voice actor for Central Park. She was a featured comic on Netflix's The Standups in 2021.

She gained wide prominence in her role as a main cast member on the ABC comedy Abbott Elementary. Her performance as the self-involved principal Ava Coleman has been hailed by critics. James garnered award nominations including a Primetime Emmy Award for Best Supporting Actress in a Comedy Series, a TCA Award for Individual Achievement in Comedy, a Golden Globe Award, and a Critics' Choice Award.

In 2022, James hosted the ABC game show The Final Straw. She hosted the 2023 Writers Guild of America Awards.

Podcasts 
In 2019 she hosted Strong Black Laughs, an interview podcast featuring a variety of established Black comedians, including Luenell and Sherri Shepherd. She hosted You In Danger, Gurl, a comedy podcast about relationship red flags and bizarre dating experiences, in 2020.

Personal life 
James was raised on St. Thomas and moved to the United States mainland when she was 16. She resides in Brooklyn, New York and has two teenage sons.

Discography 

 2017: Black and Mild

Filmography

Television

Film

Awards and nominations 

 2016 –  Brooklyn's 50 Funniest People
 2016 – Just For Laughs New Faces
 2020 – Variety's 10 Comics to Watch

References

External links 
 Official website
 

Year of birth missing (living people)
Living people
American women comedians
American women screenwriters
21st-century American actresses
Comedians from New York City
American women podcasters
American stand-up comedians
African-American female comedians
21st-century African-American women
21st-century African-American people
American people of Virgin Islands descent
American people of Caribbean descent
People from Saint Thomas, U.S. Virgin Islands